Bapu Gokhale was army chief (Senapati) of the Marathas in the Third Anglo-Maratha War.

Early life
Gokhale was born Narhar Ganesh Gokhale into the Chitpavan brahmin Gokhale gharana of Tale Khajan.

Career
Gokhale was appointed commander-in -chief by Peshwa Baji Rao II with the preparations of the Third Anglo-Maratha War against the East India Company in 1818. He died on February 19, 1818, during the battle of Ashti (now in Mohol taluka, Solapur, Maharashtra) while defending the Peshwa from the company forces. He died with a sword in his hand just as he had wished to have preferred to.

Family and descendants
Gokhale had two wives. The first wife had two children. Their first child died early. Their other son, Gopal was killed during the Battle of Ashti. He did not have any children with his second wife Yamunabai. She went to Satara after her husband's death. He was also a great-uncle of Dwarka Gokhale, wife of Chandrashekhar Agashe.

See also

Balaji Pant Natu
Maratha Empire

Notes

References
 
 
 
 

Wars involving the Maratha Empire
People of the Maratha Empire
1817 in India
1818 in India
1818 deaths
Year of birth unknown
1777 births